A special election was held in  on August 4, 1797 to fill a vacancy left by the resignation of Theophilus Bradbury (F) upon his appointment to the Massachusetts Supreme Judicial Court on July 24, 1797.

Election results

Bartlett took his seat November 27, 1797

See also
List of special elections to the United States House of Representatives

References

United States House of Representatives 1797 11
Massachusetts 1797 11
Massachusetts 1797 11
1797 11
Massachusetts 11
United States House of Representatives 11